η Microscopii, Latinised as Eta Microscopii, is a solitary star in the constellation Microscopium. It is visible to the naked eye as a dim, orange-hued star with an apparent visual magnitude of 5.53. The star is located around 910 light-years distant from the Sun based on parallax, and is drifting further away with a radial velocity of +22 km/s.

This is an aging giant star with a stellar classification of K3 III, indicating that it has exhausted the supply of hydrogen at its core then cooled and expanded. At present it has around 47 times the girth of the Sun. The star is radiating 735 times the luminosity of the Sun from its swollen photosphere at an effective temperature of 4,365 K.

Multiple star catalogues list two optical companions.  Two arc-minutes away, the 8th magnitude HD 200733 is a main sequence star much closer to Earth than η Microscopii.  A 14th-magnitude star one arc-minute from η Microscopii is a background object.

References

K-type giants
Microscopium
Microscopii, Eta
Durchmusterung objects
200702
104177
8069